Cristian Nicolás Correa (born 25 May 1991) is an Argentine professional footballer who plays as a goalkeeper.

Career
Correa began in the ranks of Talleres. He was selected four times during the 2012–13 Primera C Metropolitana, which preceded the goalkeeper leaving at the conclusion of the campaign to join fellow fourth tier team Deportivo Español. After no appearances for them in two seasons, Correa left in January 2015 to play for Argentino. Six months later, he rejoined Deportivo Español; now playing in Primera B Metropolitana. His professional debut arrived on 22 September against Platense, which was one of three appearances in 2015. Correa stayed for the subsequent 2016 and 2016–17 campaigns, featuring in fifty-one fixtures.

On 31 July 2017, Correa joined Primera B Nacional side San Martín. They won promotion to the Argentine Primera División in his first twelve months, but he failed to participate in a competitive match during 2017–18; though was an unused substitute twenty-nine times. June 2018 saw Correa complete a move to Defensores de Belgrano. He made his bow on 24 July as the club lost 4–1 to Atlético de Rafaela.

Career statistics
.

References

External links

1991 births
Living people
People from Reconquista, Santa Fe
Argentine footballers
Association football goalkeepers
Primera C Metropolitana players
Primera B Metropolitana players
Talleres de Remedios de Escalada footballers
Deportivo Español footballers
Argentino de Merlo footballers
San Martín de Tucumán footballers
Defensores de Belgrano footballers
CSyD Tristán Suárez footballers
Club Atlético Mitre footballers
Sportspeople from Santa Fe Province